The Day Passed is a 1971 Azerbaijani romantic drama film directed by Arif Babayev. It stars Leyla Shikhlinskaya as Asmar, Hasan Mammadov as Ogtay, and Hasanagha Turabov as Ogtay's colleague. It is an adaptation of the novel "Georgian Surname" by Azerbaijani author Anar Rzayev. Rzayev published the novel in 1967 and later adapted it into a screenplay himself.

The film tells the story of two reconciled childhood friends as they reflect on their past, and also encapsulates the atmosphere and soul of Baku at the time. The title refers to the characters' inability to change their past and what has already happened.

Upon release, The Day Passed garnered widespread popularity and critical acclaim in Azerbaijan. It is now considered one of the best Azerbaijani films from the 1970s.

Plot
Asmar, one of the main characters of the film, appears to be happy at first glance. She is married to a diplomat, has a daughter, and many friends. She has exciting memories of travelling all over the world. She used to enjoy her entertaining and pleasant lifestyle, but as time passed, its value and significance faded in her eyes. She still had not found her true place in life.

After separating from Ogtay, she desires to rebuild her life and make certain concessions. The film ends on the note that it is impossible to live clinging to the past and memories, and that everyone should look forward to their future.

During the shooting, actor Hasan Mammadov refused to perform the film's ending, which originally included a sexually intimate scene between Ogtay and Asmar. As a result, the writers were forced to make amends to certain parts of the screenplay.

Cast
 Leyla Shikhlinskaya as Asmar
 Hasan Mammadov as Ogtay
 Hasanagha Turabov as Ogtay's colleague
 Chingiz Aliloghlu as Jamal
 Mukhtar Avsharov as Postman
 Sadaya Mustafayeva as Asmar's mother
Torekhanum Zeynalova as Neighbour

See also
 Cinema of Azerbaijan
 Azerbaijani films from the 70s

References

External links
 

1971 films
1971 romantic drama films
Azerbaijani-language films
Films directed by Arif Babayev
Azerbaijani romantic drama films